The Harlow Block, also known as the Hayhurst Building, is a historic building located in Portland, Oregon, United States, built in 1882. It is listed on the National Register of Historic Places.

See also
 National Register of Historic Places listings in Northwest Portland, Oregon

References

1882 establishments in Oregon
Buildings and structures in Portland, Oregon
Commercial buildings completed in 1882
Italianate architecture in Oregon
National Register of Historic Places in Portland, Oregon
Pearl District, Portland, Oregon
Victorian architecture in Oregon
Portland Historic Landmarks